Lechenaultia papillata is a species of flowering plant in the family Goodeniaceae and is endemic to inland areas of south-western Western Australia. It is a diffuse, ascending shrub or subshrub with papillate, crowded, slightly fleshy leaves, and pale blue flowers.

Description

Taxonomy
Lechenaultia papillata was first formally described in 1987 by David A. Morrison in the journal Brunonia from specimens collected north of the mouth of the Oldfield River by Hansjörg Eichler in 1968. The specific epithet (papillata) means "papillate".

Distribution and habitat
This leschenaultia grows in heath, scrub or mallee in the Coolgardie, Esperance Plains and Mallee biogeographic regions of inland south-western Western Australia.

Conservation status
This leschenaultia is listed as "not threatened" by the Government of Western Australia Department of Biodiversity, Conservation and Attractions.

References

External links
 Esperance Wildflowers: Images of ''Lechenaultia papillata

Asterales of Australia
papillata
Eudicots of Western Australia
Plants described in 1987